The City of Moorabbin was a local government area about  southeast of Melbourne, the state capital of Victoria, Australia.

History

Moorabbin was first incorporated as a road district on 16 May 1862. It became a shire on 27 January 1871, and was essentially rural in character, relying on the villages on its western side for services. As regions on the coast became more urban in character, local severance movements successfully obtained their own local governments. On 3 April 1912, one part was united with the Town of Brighton to the northwest. On 28 February 1917, the Borough of Sandringham split away, while on 26 May 1920, the Borough of Mentone and Mordialloc also split away. Eventually, with the development of areas such as Bentleigh and Cheltenham within the shire's boundaries, Moorabbin was proclaimed a city, on 10 October 1934. On 1 October 1959, it lost a further piece of land to the City of Oakleigh.

On 15 December 1994, the City of Moorabbin was abolished, and was split three ways; Bentleigh was transferred into the newly created City of Glen Eira, along with the City of Caulfield; Cheltenham was transferred into the newly created City of Bayside, along with the Cities of Brighton and Sandringham; while the bulk of the city merged with the Cities of Chelsea and Mordialloc, and parts of the Cities of Oakleigh and Springvale, to become the newly created City of Kingston.

Municipal offices
The council originally met in the Plough and Harrow Hotel, a site now occupied by the Moorabbin Junction Hotel, on the corner of the Nepean Highway and South Road, Moorabbin. The first town hall was built on the other side of South Road in 1867, and enlarged in 1907. In 1931, municipal offices were constructed next to the town hall. A new town hall, designed by Bates, Smart and McCutcheon, was officially opened in 1963, near the Moorabbin railway station. In 1970, new council chambers and meeting rooms were added. The municipal site is currently home to the Kingston City Hall and the Kingston Arts Centre.

Wards

The City of Moorabbin was subdivided into four wards on 21 May 1929, each electing three councillors:
 North Ward
 Centre Ward
 Cheltenham Ward
 Moorabbin Ward

Suburbs
 Beaumaris (shared with the Cities of Mordialloc and Sandringham)
 Bentleigh
 Bentleigh East
 Cheltenham (shared with the City of Sandringham)
 Clarinda (shared with the City of Oakleigh)
 Hampton East
 Heatherton
 Highett
 McKinnon
 Mentone (small section near Moorabbin Airport)
 Moorabbin*
 Moorabbin Airport
 Oakleigh South (shared with the City of Oakleigh)
 Ormond (shared with the City of Caulfield)

* Council seat.

Population

* Estimate in the 1958 Victorian Year Book.

References

External links
 Victorian Places - Moorabbin

Moorabbin
1862 establishments in Australia
City of Bayside
1994 disestablishments in Australia
City of Glen Eira
City of Kingston (Victoria)